Harqma is a soup or stew prepared using lamb. It is common in the Maghreb area of Northern Africa. Harqma is often consumed during Ramadan, as a meal to break one's fast (sawm) after sunset. Lamb's trotters are sometimes used as an ingredient. It has been suggested that harqma originated from the Middle Ages.

See also
 African cuisine
 List of African dishes
 List of soups

References

African soups
Lamb dishes
North African cuisine